Women's Prison Massacre is a 1983 film directed by Bruno Mattei and starring Laura Gemser, Gabriele Tinti, Carlo De Mejo, Lorraine De Selle, and Franca Stoppi.

Plot 
Emanuelle (Laura Gemser) is sent to a violent women's prison. While she is in prison, she comes into confrontation with the "top dog" inmate Albina (Ursula Flores), ending in a series of fights. Albina gets the worse of it, including a broken arm, a knife in her leg, and her wig pulled off. Following a series of cat fights and arguments, the women's lives are interrupted by the arrival of four male death row inmates led by "Crazy Boy" Henderson (Gabriele Tinti), who break into the prison. The male convicts proceed to rape, mutilate and torture the female inmates (involving a sick game of Russian roulette) and executions. One convict is killed when a SWAT team attempts to invade the prison.  Another is killed by a female inmate who hides a razor blade inside her vagina before enticing him to have his way with her. Henderson and the remaining male cons attempt to break out using the warden (Lorraine De Selle), Emanuelle and a wounded sheriff as human shields. After a gory finale, Emanuelle and the sheriff (Carlo De Mejo) are the only characters left alive and the sheriff promises to reopen her case.

Cast
 Laura Gemser as Emanuelle
 Gabriele Tinti as "Crazy Boy" Henderson
 Ursula Flores as Albina
 María Romano as Laura
 Antonella Giacomini as Irene
 Raul Cabrera as Victor "Geronimo" Brain
 Pierangelo Pozzato as Helmut "Blade" Von Bauer
 Robert Mura as Brett O'Hara
 Michael Laurant as Prison Official
 Françoise Perrot as Molly, The Guard
 Franca Stoppi as Head Guard
 Jacques Stany as District Attorney Robinson
 Carlo De Mejo as Lawman Harrison
 Lorraine De Selle as Warden Colleen

Production
The French funding for the film was provided by an undergarments company which is worn by the female cast during the film. The liner notes for the Women's Prison Massacre DVD release state "Mattei, using the moniker Gilbert Roussel, shot Women's Prison Massacre back-to-back with his Violence in a Women's Prison. It has basically the same cast, but both films are completely different."

Release
Women's Prison Massacre was released in 1983.

On December 8, 2015, Shout! Factory released this film on Blu-Ray under the title Women's Prison Massacre. The film has been released under the titles Révolte au pénitencier de filles in France and  I violenti in Italy. The film has also been released under the titles Emmanuelle in Prison and Emmanuelle Escapes from Hell.

Review
AllMovie reviewed the film saying "For even the most jaded fans of the genre, Women's Prison Massacre is as entertaining and arousing as autopsy footage. As unpleasant as it is, though, the film doesn't begin to approach the depths reached by Mattei's previous effort (Violence in a Women's Prison (1982)) which features the same cast, crew, and basic plot."

References

Sources
 Palmerini, Luca, Gaetano Mistretta (1996), Spaghetti Nightmares, Key West: Fantasma Books. pp. 55.

External links 

 

Italian erotic thriller films
English-language Italian films
Italian sexploitation films
Films directed by Bruno Mattei
Emanuelle
Women in prison films
1983 films
1980s Italian films
1980s French films